Nassi is a Moroccan-born French singer-songwriter.

Biography 
Nassi started writing songs at the age of 11.

Before deciding to "step out of the shade" and start a singing career, he had written songs for other artists, such as Kendji Girac, Claudio Capéo, Soprano and H Magnum.

In January 2017, he released his debut solo single, titled "La vie est belle", which reached number 100 on the French singles chart in April and would eventually be certified Gold by the French national syndicate for music publishing (SNEP).

This was followed by the single "Pas fatigué" in June.

In addition to several singles, Nassi has released his album "Arabesque" in 3 volumes.

In 2018, Nassi had a shot at representing France at that year's Eurovision Song Contest with his song "Rêves de gamin", reaching the final of the national preliminaries (televised on France 2 under the title Destination Eurovision).

Nassi's music has been featured in the educational song competition "Manie Musicale" in 2020, 2022, and 2023.

Musical style 
Nassi self-identifies as "a singer, not a rapper".

Discography

Singles 
 "Je pense à nous" (Akela feat. Nassi) [Radio Edit] (2015)
 "La vie est belle" (2017)
 "Pas Fatigué" (2017)
 "Rêves de gamin" (2018)
 "Mes yeux" (2018)
 "Dancing" (2019)
 "Choix de vie" (Anas feat. Nassi) (2019)
 "À la dérive" (2019)
 "Toi et moi" (2019)
 "Souhila" (2020)
 "Wana" (2022)
 "Rifia" (2022)

References

External links 
 Nassi – “La vie est belle" (official video) on YouTube

French male singer-songwriters
21st-century French male singers
French rappers
21st-century Moroccan male singers
Year of birth missing (living people)
Living people